is a 2021 Japanese animated action fantasy film based on the Pretty Cure franchise created by Izumi Todo, and the second film for the Tropical-Rouge! Pretty Cure series, following Petite Dive! Collaboration Dance Party! short film (2021). The film is directed by Junji Shimizu, written by Yoshimi Narita, and produced by Toei Animation. The film was released in Japan on October 23, 2021.

Featuring the Pretty Cure teams from HeartCatch PreCure!, Manatsu and the others explore the Snow Kingdom on Shantia, summoned by its princess, Sharon.

Plot
After the Tropical-Rouge! Pretty Cure team: Cures Summer, Coral, Papaya, Flamingo and La Mer defeats the Yaraneeda summoned by Numeri, Sango tells everyone at the beach about the singing event at the mall, which interests Laura. Moments after, Sharon uses the Huangs to invite Manatsu and the others to the Snow Kingdom of Chantia. After arriving to the kingdom via the train, Sharon welcomes the girls and tells them to have fun before the coronation. During the snowball fight, they encounter the HeartCatch PreCure team: Tsubomi, Erika, Itsuki and Yuri. After spending time together and having brief tension with Erika, Laura meets Sharon in the courtyard, who gives her the Snow Heart Kuru Ring. During the coronation, Sharon freezes the performers as they are trying to leave the country after their act, and orders the snow monsters to attack. The Tropical-Rouge! and HeartCatch teams transform and defeat the monsters. 

Sharon reveals to them that Chantia was destroyed long ago during a meteor strike, and plans to use the meteorite's power to bring Chantia back to life, as how it did with her. After Blossom and Marine's failed attack caused by La Mer's protection of Sharon, she locks the HeartCatch team in the basement. After Coral, Papaya and Flamingo rescues the trapped HeartCatch team from the basement, La Mer confronts Sharon, who suggests she and La Mer combine powers to save Chantia, but refuses. Unable to control her emotions, Sharon creates strong snow monsters to defeat the Cures. However, using the power of the Snow Heart Kuru Ring and powers from the HeartCatch team, the Tropical-Rouge! team gains Snow Crystal Tropical Style, and purifies Sharon with "Heart Shining Orchestra" attack. 

With her strength dwindling, Sharon is moved by La Mer's Chantia song. La Mer tells Sharon that she'll sing the kingdom's song for eternity, while Blossom tells her that the kingdom's flower, Snowdrop is still blooming in the present. With the stone gone, Sharon tells Laura that she's glad that they met before she disappears. Back home on Minamino Island, Laura and the others sing Chantia song during the singing event at the mall, with Tsubomi and the others cheering them on.

Voice cast
Fairouz Ai as Manatsu Natsuumi/Cure Summer
Yumiri Hanamori as Sango Suzumura/Cure Coral
Yui Ishikawa as Minori Ichinose/Cure Papaya
Asami Seto as Asuka Takizawa/Cure Flamingo
Rina Hidaka as Laura/Cure La Mer
Aimi Tanaka as Kururun
Nana Mizuki as Tsubomi Hanasaki/Cure Blossom
Fumie Mizusawa as Erika Kurumi/Cure Marine
Houko Kuwashima as Itsuki Myoudouin/Cure Sunshine
Aya Hisakawa as Yuri Tsukikage/Cure Moonlight
Taeko Kawata as Chypre
Motoko Kumai as Coffret
Kokoro Kikuchi as Potpourri
Marika Matsumoto as Sharon, the Princess of the Snow Kingdom of Chantia
Tomori Kusunoki as Huang, the spirits of the Snow Kingdom of Chantia
Shin'ya Takahashi as Snow Monsters
Akeno Watanabe as Numeri

Production
On July 2021, it was announced that Tropical-Rouge! Pretty Cure series will receive a feature film, following Tropical-Rouge! Pretty Cure the Movie: Petite Dive! Collaboration Dance Party! short film that was released alongside Healin' Good Pretty Cure the Movie: GoGo! Big Transformation! The Town of Dreams earlier that year. Pretty Cure episode director Junji Shimizu is directing the film, with Yoshimi Narita, whom wrote the Yes! PreCure 5 GoGo! series and HappinessCharge PreCure! the Movie: The Ballerina of the Land of Dolls film, providing the screenplay, and Pretty Cure episode animation director Ken Ueno is providing the character design and animation direction for the film. The film will feature the main Pretty Cure teams from HeartCatch PreCure series, making the third Pretty Cure standalone film to be a crossover following Kirakira Pretty Cure a la Mode the Movie: Crisply! The Memory of the Mille-feuille! in 2017, and Healin' Good Pretty Cure the Movie: GoGo! Big Transformation! The Town of Dreams in 2021. The voice actresses from HeartCatch PreCure! individually expressed their gratitude for their appearance in the film. The same day, Japanese actress Marika Matsumoto was cast as Sharon.

Pretty Cure and HeartCatch PreCure!.

Release
The film was released in theaters in Japan on October 23, 2021.

Reception
The film debuted at number 1 out of top 10 in the Japanese box office in its opening weekend, and later dropped to number 4 the following week.

References

External links
 

 

2020s Japanese films
Pretty Cure films
Toei Animation films
2021 anime films
Japanese magical girl films
Crossover anime and manga
Films set in a fictional country